The 2000 Scottish League Cup final was played on 19 March 2000 at Hampden Park in Glasgow and was the final of the 53rd Scottish League Cup. The final was contested by Aberdeen and Celtic. Celtic won the match 2–0, thanks to goals from Vidar Riseth and Tommy Johnson.

This was the first League Cup final in many years to be played in March, as  previous finals had taken place in November; this format continued until the 2016–17 season (coincidentally the same teams would also contest that final).

The match was something of a Scandinavian affair, with Aberdeen's Danish manager Ebbe Skovdahl selecting three Norwegian players (one of whom, Thomas Solberg, was dismissed); Celtic fielded another Norwegian (Riseth, who opened the scoring) plus a Swede and a Dane. The Glasgow club's famous Swedish striker of the time, Henrik Larsson, was absent recovering from a broken leg.

Match details

Teams

2000
League Cup Final
Scottish League Cup Final 2000
Scottish League Cup Final 2000
1990s in Glasgow
2000s in Glasgow
March 2000 sports events in the United Kingdom